Wigram is a surname, and may refer to:

 Clive Wigram, 1st Baron Wigram (1873–1960), Private Secretary to the Sovereign
 Edgar T. A. Wigram, that is Edgar Thomas Ainger Wigram (1864-1935), British painter
 George Wigram, that is George Vicesimus Wigram (1805–1879)  English biblical scholar and theologian
 Sir Henry Wigram (1857–1934), New Zealand businessman for whom Wigram Aerodrome is named
 General Sir Kenneth Wigram (1875–1949), British Army officer
 Joseph Wigram (1798–1867), British churchman, archdeacon of Surrey, archdeacon of Winchester and bishop of Rochester
 Lionel Wigram (film producer) (born 1962), British film producer and screenplay writer
 Lionel Wigram (British Army officer) (1907–1944), British soldier
 Loftus Wigram (1803–1889), British barrister, businessman and Conservative politician
 Money Wigram ( 1790–1873), English shipbuilder and ship owner
 Neville Wigram, 2nd Baron Wigram (1915–2017), retired Lieutenant Colonel of the British Army
 Octavius Wigram (1794–1878), English business man and ship owner, a member of Lloyds and Governor of the Royal Exchange Assurance Corporation
 Ralph Wigram (1890–1936), British government official
 Sir Robert Wigram, 1st Baronet (1744–1830), British merchant shipbuilder and politician
 William Ainger Wigram (1872–1953), English Church of England priest and author
 Woolmore Wigram (1831–1907), English Church of England priest and campanologist